Fuck Off Get Free We Pour Light on Everything is the seventh and final studio album by the Canadian experimental rock group Thee Silver Mt. Zion Memorial Orchestra. The album was released on January 20, 2014 on Constellation Records.

The final track is dedicated to Capital Steez, a Brooklyn rapper who killed himself the previous year.

Track listing

Personnel
 Thierry Amar: Upright bass, electric bass, plucked piano, vocals
 Efrim Menuck: Electric guitar, acoustic guitar, mellotron, vocals
 Jessica Moss: Violin, plucked piano, vocals
 Sophie Trudeau: Violin, plucked piano, vocals
 David Payant: Drums, organ, vocals

References

2014 albums
Thee Silver Mt. Zion albums
Constellation Records (Canada) albums